Acanthophyllum takhtajanii, or Takhtadjyan's allochrusa, is a species of flowering plant in the family Caryophyllaceae. It is endemic to Armenia, where it is only found in one location near Surenavan in the Urts Mountains in steppe at 800 m elevation. It is threatened by shifting agriculture and overgrazing.

References

Caryophyllaceae
Critically endangered plants
Endemic flora of Armenia